Abdulmohsen Hamad Al-Bassam is a retired officer in the Royal Saudi Air Force and a former astronaut. He was the back-up payload specialist for Sultan bin Salman bin Abdulaziz Al Saud on STS-51-G.

Background 
Abdulmohsen Hamad Al-Bassam was born on December 12, 1948, in Unayzah, Saudi Arabia. He graduated from King Faisal Air Academy in Riyadh (Bachelor of Science in Air Science) and was a Fighter pilot at the Royal Saudi Air Force. He later served as the Air Force Attache at the Embassy of Saudi Arabia in London, United Kingdom. He is married and he has 2 sons and 3 daughters.

Experience 

Selected in April 1985, he served as the back-up payload specialist for STS-51-G Discovery (June 17–24, 1985) on which Arabsat-1B was deployed. With the conclusion of this flight on June 24, 1985, he retired from active duty as a payload specialist. He later served as the Air Force Attache at the Embassy of Saudi Arabia in London, United Kingdom.

External links 
 Spacefacts biography of Abdulmohsen Hamad Al-Bassam

1948 births
Living people
Saudi Arabian astronauts
Saudi Arabian aviators
Royal Saudi Air Force personnel
People from Unaizah
Air attachés